"Free Smoke" is a song by Canadian rapper Drake from his album, More Life (2017). The song was released on April 18, 2017 as the third single from More Life after "Passionfruit".  The song features additional background vocals by Baka Not Nice, who is one of two credited musicians on More Life. The song was perceived by the media as a diss track to Meek Mill, as well as other rappers he could be feuding with. It reached the top 20 in Canada and the United States.

Commercial performance
On April 8, 2017, "Free Smoke" entered the charts at number 12 and spent six weeks on the Billboard Canadian Hot 100. The song spent four weeks on the US Billboard Hot 100, entering the charts at number 18, its immediate peak, on April 8, 2017.

The song peaked in the top 40 in Ireland, Switzerland, the United Kingdom and charted on the charts of France, Germany, the Netherlands, New Zealand (Heatseekers), Portugal, Slovakia, and Sweden.

Charts

Certifications

Release history

References

2017 singles
2017 songs
Drake (musician) songs
Songs written by Drake (musician)
Songs written by Boi-1da
Song recordings produced by Boi-1da
Diss tracks
Songs written by Allen Ritter
Songs written by Tony Yayo
OVO Sound singles
Song recordings produced by Allen Ritter